Xavier Navarrot (in Occitan classical norm : Xavier Navarròt) was an Occitan-language poet from Béarn.

He was born near Lucq-de-Béarn in a wealthy family and studied law and medicine in Paris before returning in Béarn where he spent the rest of his life.

He was a supporter of the republic and of progressivist ideas, which was humoristically stated in his poetry.

Bibliography

Navarrot's editions 
 Navarrot, Xavier. Estrées Béarnéses en ta l'an 1820. Pau : Vignancourt, 1820.
 Navarrot, Xavier. Dialogue entré Moussu Matheü, l'Electou, y Jean de Mingequannas, lou Bouhèmi. Pau, 1838.
 Navarrot, Xavier. Nouvelles étrennes béarnaises pour l'année 1847. Pau : Véronèse, 1846.
 Navarrot, Xavier. A Messieurs les jurés. Pau : Thonnet, 1850.
Lespy, Vastin. Chansons de Xavier Navarrot. Pau : Véronèse, 1868.
 Camelat, Miquèu. Obres. Samatan : Éditorial Occitan, 1924.

Critics 
 Darrigrand, Robèrt. Tèxtes causits. Montpellier : Centre d'études occitanes de l'Université, 1970.
 Anatole, Cristian - Lafont, Robert. Nouvelle histoire de la littérature occitane. París :  P.U.F., 1970.

References 

Occitan-language writers
Occitan-language poets
People from Oloron-Sainte-Marie
19th-century French poets